The IMAM Ro.57 was an Italian twin-engined, single-seat monoplane fighter of the Regia Aeronautica. Based on a 1939 design by Giovanni Galasso the aircraft did not enter production until 1943.

Two hundred aircraft were ordered, but only 50–75 were produced in two versions, one flown as an interceptor, the other in the role of a ground attack aircraft.

Design and development 
The Ro.57 was preceded by another twin engine fighter design, the Ro.53, which never entered production. The Ro.57 consisted of an all-metal, semi-monocoque fuselage with a steel skeleton and Duralumin structure. The wings were also Duralumin. It was powered by two  Fiat A.74 radial engines giving a maximum speed of 516 km/h, which in 1939 was faster than that of the main Italian fighter, the Macchi C.200 (504 km/h).

After testing at Guidonia it was proposed by IMAM for use as a dive bomber. This transformation, which involved the addition of dive brakes, provision for 500 kg bombs and an improved forward firing armament (adding two 20 mm cannon), took time and delayed production. The resulting aircraft was designated the Ro.57bis. Performance dropped to 457 km/h maximum speed and to 350 km/h at cruise speed.  The Ro.57bis was ordered into production in 1942 and entered service with the 97° Gruppo in 1943.  About 50–60 aircraft were delivered.
 
It is said that the Ro.57 could have been the long range interceptor that Italy lacked throughout the war. It proved to be too costly for the limited weapons it carried and it never was assigned a clear role. A better-armed version with more powerful engines was developed as the Ro.58.

Variants
Ro.57 
Single-seat fighter with Fiat A.74 radial engines, and two 12.7 mm Breda-SAFAT machine guns
Ro.57bis
The dive bombing variant fitted with dive brakes, two 20 mm cannon in addition to the 12.7 mm guns and a crutch for bombs up to  under the fuselage

Operators
  Kingdom of Italy
 Regia Aeronautica

Specifications (Ro.57)

See also

References

Further reading
Lembo, Daniele Officine Ferroviarie Meridionali IMAM, Aerei nella Storia magazine n.34 Nov 2003, Delta editions, Parma.

External links

 Comando Supremo: IMAM Ro.57
  IMAM Ro.57 
 Italian Aircraft 1939–45

Ro.57
1930s Italian fighter aircraft
World War II Italian fighter aircraft
World War II Italian ground attack aircraft
Aircraft first flown in 1939
Twin piston-engined tractor aircraft